Little Britches on the Road is an American travel show on RFD-TV and premiered March 6, 2013.

The series highlights rural communities across the United States. It is a spin-off of Little Britches Rodeo.

Overview 
On the Road is a travel documentary series that focuses on small towns, rural areas, and the western lifestyle. It features gorgeous scenery and rural living at its best.

Narration 
Every episode has been narrated by Donna Hodge.

Notable guests 
 Mary Fallin - Governor of Oklahoma
 Jim Reese - Oklahoma Secretary of Agriculture
 Micah McKinney - Owner of Lazy E
 Leslie McKinney - Owner of Lazy E
 Shorty Koger - Shorty's Cowboy Hattery

Locations Featured 
 Searcy, Arkansas
 DeRidder, Louisiana
 Falcon, Colorado
 Guthrie, Oklahoma
 Edmond, Oklahoma
 Neighborhoods of Oklahoma City
 Torrington, Wyoming

Episodes

Series overview

Season 1 (2013)

Season 2 (2013)

Season 3 (2014)

Season 4 (2015)

Season 5 (2016)

Season 6 (2017)

References

External links 
 

English-language television shows
First-run syndicated television programs in the United States
Rural society in the United States
Television shows set in Colorado
Television shows set in Oklahoma
Television shows set in Arkansas
Television shows set in Louisiana
Television shows set in Wyoming